Katrin Kauschke (born 13 September 1971 in Braunschweig, Lower Saxony) is a former field hockey midfield player from Germany.

Kauschke was a member of the Women's National Team that won the silver medal at the 1992 Summer Olympics in Barcelona, Spain. She competed in three consecutive Summer Olympics, starting in 1992. In total, she has represented Germany in 190 matches.

During her club career, she played for Eintracht Braunschweig and Berliner HC.

References

External links
 

1971 births
Living people
Sportspeople from Braunschweig
German female field hockey players
Field hockey players at the 1992 Summer Olympics
Field hockey players at the 1996 Summer Olympics
Field hockey players at the 2000 Summer Olympics
Olympic field hockey players of Germany
Olympic silver medalists for Germany
Olympic medalists in field hockey
Medalists at the 1992 Summer Olympics
20th-century German women
21st-century German women